Talanga pallidimargo is a moth in the family Crambidae. It was described by Joseph de Joannis in 1929. It is found in Vietnam.

References

Moths described in 1929
Spilomelinae
Moths of Asia